The Paklenica karst river canyon is a national park in Croatia. It is near Starigrad, northern Dalmatia, on the southern slopes of Velebit mountain, not far from Zadar. It contains two canyons, Mala (Small) and Velika (Big) Paklenica. Today there is no water flowing through Mala Paklenica. Near the entrance to the Velika Paklenica is an artificial tunnel complex built for Josip Broz Tito during the tension between Yugoslavia and the USSR in the late 1940s and early 1950s.

History
The area of South Velebit has been inhabited since prehistoric times. It is believed that, during the last ice age, the area was probably inhabited by small groups of Paleolithic hunters/gatherers, as elsewhere in the Mediterranean. Sea level must have been 120 metres lower than today, and the Velebit Channel was a wide valley with a river flowing through it. The highest parts of the Velebit were covered with glaciers. When sea level began to rise in the late ice age, people moved to higher, hilly areas. The earliest records of humans in Velebit – Mesolithic flint tools found in Vaganačka Cave under Veliko Rujno – date back to this era.

Approximately eight thousand years ago, the first cattle breeders and farmers arrived in the area, bringing wheat, domestic goats and sheep, as well as the knowledge of their breeding. Hunter-gathering lost its importance, and livestock-rearing began on Velebit. Plenty of material evidence, such as bones of domestic animals, tools and equipment used by prehistoric shepherds and decorated clay tableware, was found in the caves that served as shelter for people and cattle.

During the last two thousand years BC, during the Bronze Age, the first fortifications and stone buildings were erected by Liburian peoples. They could serve as shelter to the population from the surrounding villages in case of danger, and some of them may have been permanent settlements where the local rulers had their seats. In addition, they oversaw important cattle and trade routes leading to Velebit and further to Lika via Paklenica or Rujan. Some of them served to oversee navigation. They are now destroyed, but ring-shaped mounds ("gromila", pl. "gromile") up to several meters in height can still be seen in some places. In the immediate vicinity of the fortifications, casket heaps – deposits of large round stone under which former rulers were buried in caskets made of stone tablets – have been found. Most of them have been dug out and the graves robbed, but they are still visible, as in the area of hamlet Ljubotić in Tribanj.

Over the last two thousand years BC, the east coast of the Adriatic was gradually conquered by the Roman legions. After the Roman province of Dalmatia was founded in the early 1st century AD, permanent Roman reign was established. Starigrad (Roman name: Argyruntum) was established at the time, and it soon developed into an important trading center. In the 4th century AD, Emperor Tiberius had it fortified with walls and towers. The town cemetery was situated by the road that led southwest of the town.  Plenty of archaeological findings were collected from approximately 400 explored graves – jewelry, glassware and metalware, weapons and tools. The most interesting finding is certainly the ancient glass collection – as many as 146 vessels of different forms (bowls, glasses, bottled) – kept in the Zadar Museum of Archeology.

Life in Argyruntum came to a standstill in the early 4th century AD. The era of peace was interrupted by attacks of barbaric nations that eventually led to the decline of the Roman state. In an attempt to bring the Adriatic coast back into the Empire, East Roman Emperor Justinian built a system of fortifications to secure navigation and protect the local population. The ruins of forts and towers above Modrič and near Sveta Trojica in Tribanj are parts of this defensive system that briefly postponed the final decline of the ancient world in the Adriatic.

The arrival of Croats in this area began in the early Middle Ages. The earliest preserved traces of their presence are the chapels, St. George (Sv. Juraj) in Rovanjska, St. Peter (Sv. Petar) in Starigrad, and St. Mary Magdalene (Sv. Marija Magdalena or Trstenica) built from the 9th or 12th century AD. Two forts – Večka Kula and Paklarić – were probably erected in the late Middle Ages (14th–16th century).

Geological features 

The most attractive and most valuable parts of South Velebit are surely the impressive canyons of Velika Paklenica and Mala Paklenica. Velika Paklenica canyon is 14 km long and 500–800 m wide. In its narrowest part around the Bunkers, the canyon is only 50 m wide. Vertical cliffs rise above both sides of the canyon up to a height of over 700 m. The most attractive part is the area around the steep drop of the stream downstream from Anića luka, where steep cliffs rise directly above the stream, forming the narrowest part of the canyon between Anića luka and the parking lot. Mala Paklenica Canyon is of lesser dimension, and the torrent running through it is much less powerful. It is 12 km long and 400–500 wide. In its narrowest part, it is only 10 m wide, while the surrounding cliffs rise up to a height of 650 m.

The central part of the Park is distinctive for the relief complex of Borovnik and Crni vrh, with the valley of Mala Močila and Velika Močila nearby. In terms of relief, Velika Močila is a very interesting bowl-shaped valley at an altitude 850 m asl, surrounded by Crni vrh (1 110 m asl), Škiljina kosa (1 015 m asl) and Zeleni brig (842 m asl), while Borovnik, named after the black pine forest, stretches along the south edge.

The east part of the Park is very differentiated geomorphologically, inaccessible and wild. Further to the east, this zone of wilderness transforms into an area of milder forms around Malo Libinje and Veliko Libinje, karstic plateaus with numerous pits, the bottoms of which were mostly treated.

The highest area of Paklenica National Park is the narrow ridge of Velebit, 1 to 3 km wide. The highest peak of Velebit – Vaganski vrh (1 757 m asl) is also here. The area of Paklenica National Park is one of the most completely explored areas in Croatia in terms of speleology. 76 speleological objects are known and have been explored in the Park, namely 39 pits and 37 caves. We will mention some of the most interesting speleological objects in the National Park.  Vodarica Pit is the longest cave in Velebit at 300 meters, Precipice on Bunovac (534 m) is the deepest object in Central and South Velebit.

Watertight sediments are situated beneath very porous karstic deposits of carbonate rock in the extended part of Velika paklenica, Brezimenjača, and in the spring parts of Mala paklenica and the occasional flow of Orljača. This is why Paklenica National Park has several permanent or occasional flows and many permanent springs. The permanent springs of high-quality drinking water are Stražbenica, Kontinovo vrilo, Crno vrilo, Velika Močila and Pećica.

Flora

The wealth of flora is reflected in the list of 1,000 plant species and subspecies recorded to date, 79 of them endemic. The great diversity, the presence of relict, endemic, rare, statutorily protected species make the Park a very valuable floristic area, not just in Croatia, but in Europe and the world as well.

The forest phenomenon is one of the main reasons why the South Velebit area was proclaimed a national park.  Areas of oak and oriental hornbeam forests, beech forest, black pine forests, and fern forest, can all be found in the park.
In 2017, the beech forests within the national park were added to the UNESCO World Heritage Site known as Ancient and Primeval Beech Forests of the Carpathians and Other Regions of Europe because of their testimony to the ecological history of forest dynamics within Europe since the last Ice Age.

Fauna

The diverse habitats in Paklenica and the vertical stratification provide home to a diverse fauna. Invertebrates are relatively poorly explored, attractive insects like diurnal butterflies are well explored.  Over 40 species of amphibians and reptiles are found, the endangered Orsini's viper is a highlight.

Birds are the most numerous group of vertebrates, with 230 species recorded to date. The world of birds is represented by 102 species of nesting birds found in the broader park area. The nesting bird group includes a community of birds inhabiting rocks and cliffs in the canyons of Velika Paklenica and Mala Paklenica, with 24 bird species. A special value is added to the park by the endangered and rare bird species such as the golden eagle, peregrine falcon, short-toed eagle and goshawk. Forest areas are rich with woodpeckers, the rarest among them being the white-backed woodpecker and middle spotted woodpecker.

There are also 53 species of mammals at the park, the roe deer and chamois are highlights, while the brown bear is the biggest predator.  In the caves there is a host of interesting underground animals such as crabs, mites, Nematodes, aquatic worms, spiders, pseudoscorpion, beetles and bats.

Tourism

Hiking is the only way to really get to know Paklenica. The Park area contains 150–200 km of trails and paths, from those intended for tourists, leading from Velika Paklenica Canyon to Manita peć cave, Lugarnica forest cottage and the mountain hut, to those intended for mountaineers, leading to the highest peaks of Velebit. The trails in the Park are marked with boards and mountaineering signs.

Paklenica National Park is the most visited climbing site in Croatia, and the largest in Southeast Europe. The close proximity of seawater gives this climbing site a special charm, making Paklenica Riviera an ideal place to combine climbing and water sports. Today, there are over 360 equipped and improved routes of various difficulty levels and lengths within Paklenica’s climbing sites, so each climber can find to their liking. The main climbing season begins in spring and goes on until late autumn.

Sources

 Paklenica at enciklopedija.hr

External links

 Paklenica national park
 National park Paklenica – Web camera

National parks of Croatia
Landforms of Zadar County
Protected areas of Zadar County
Primeval Beech Forests in Europe